The Emergency Powers Act 1964 is an Act of the Parliament of the United Kingdom and was passed to amend the Emergency Powers Act 1920 and make permanent the Defence (Armed Forces) Regulations 1939. Section 1 of this Act did not apply to Northern Ireland.

Section 1(1) of the Emergency Powers Act 1920 which stated:

"If at any time it appears to His Majesty that any action has been taken or is immediately threatened by any persons or body of persons of such a nature and on so extensive a scale as to be calculated, by interfering with the supply and distribution of food, water, fuel, or light, or with the means of locomotion, to deprive the community, or any substantial portion of the community, of the essentials of life, His Majesty may, by proclamation (hereinafter referred to as a proclamation of emergency), declare that a state of emergency exists."

was amended:

"...for the words from 'any action' to 'so extensive a scale' there shall be substituted the words 'there have occurred, or are about to occur, events of such a nature'."

Section 1 was repealed by the Civil Contingencies Act 2004.

Section 2 of this Act amended the Defence (Armed Forces) Regulations 1939 which allowed soldiers 'temporary employment in agricultural work or in other work, being urgent work of national importance' by making this permanent.

In 2004, the Joint Committee of the House of Commons and House of Lords named this Act a 'fundamental part of the constitutional law' of the UK.

References

1964 in law
Emergency laws in the United Kingdom
United Kingdom Acts of Parliament 1964
Constitutional laws of the United Kingdom